Marcelo D'Andrea is an Argentine film actor

Filmography
 Manual de un tacaño (2018) The Ratman (Independent film)
 El Ciudadano Ilustre (2016)
 El Custodio (2006), The Minder
 Potestad (2002)
 Claim (2002)
 Yepeto (1999)
 La Peste (1992) aka The Plague

External links
 
 

Argentine male film actors
Living people
Year of birth missing (living people)
Place of birth missing (living people)